Son of Sam or David Berkowitz (born 1953) is an American serial killer.

Son of Sam may also refer to:

 Son of Sam (band), an American horror punk band
 Son of Sam, an Australian hip-hop artist, and member of the group Lgeez
 Son of Sam (album), by Krizz Kaliko, 2013
 Son of Sam (EP), by Lucki, 2016
 "Son of Sam" (song), by Elliott Smith, 2000
 "Son of Sam"/"Bombs Over Broadway", a single by Violent Soho, 2010
 "Son of Sam", a song by Shinedown from The Sound of Madness, 2008
 Son of Sam, a fictional house in the 2002 film The Anarchist Cookbook

See also
 Son of Sam law, any American law designed to keep criminals from profiting from the publicity of their crimes
 The Sons of Sam: A Descent Into Darkness, a 2021 TV docuseries